The Anthony Cortesy House, at 327 McCutcheon Ave. in Socorro, New Mexico, was built in 1893. It was listed on the National Register of Historic Places in 1991.

It is a two-story brick building, built as a house and having two one-story porches at an early date.  Later the porches were replaced by two-story ones, and the building was divided into apartments.

References

National Register of Historic Places in Socorro County, New Mexico
Victorian architecture in New Mexico
Houses completed in 1893